The Volvo B21 is a slanted straight-four engine first used in the Volvo 200 series, meant to replace the B20. The B21 and all derived engines are often referred to as red block engines for the red paint applied to the block. The primary differences when compared to the B20 was the switch to a SOHC in place of the older pushrod configuration, and an aluminum crossflow cylinder head versus the iron head of the B20.

History
Initially the overhead camshaft versions were offered as optional equipment on the 240, becoming standard in all markets by the 1976 model year. The overhead camshaft motors were available in displacements of 2.0 (B19 and B200), 2.1 (B21), and eventually 2.3 (B23 and B230) litres. The B21 featured an  stroke, and  bore.
The engines are tilted approximately 15 degrees to right (exhaust side) to make room for the more complicated injection systems. B19 and B21 blocks can be identified by water plugs on one side of the block. The B23 blocks have them on both sides. The camshaft is driven by a toothed belt that is driven off the front of the crankshaft. The belt turns the intermediate shaft as well, which in turn drives the oil pump, distributor (on 240 engines and BXX 700/900 series engines) and the fuel pump of carburetor models. All single camshaft versions of the engine with the exception of the K series (B200K, B230K) are of 'non-interference' design, meaning that failure of the toothed belt will not result in engine damage.

In 1981 the B21FT (a B21F with a turbo) was introduced with a compression ratio of 7.5:1 mated with a Garrett T3 turbocharger and a T camshaft. Additional turbo variants, not offered in the US market, were the B19ET and the B21ET, based on the B19E and B21E respectively. Also new for the 1981 model year in Canada (previously introduced in 1979 outside of North America) was the B23, with a displacement of 2.3 litres ( stroke and  bore). Aside from the increased bore size, the engine is identical to the B21. Volvo used a slightly different mold for the turbo engines to cast a boss for the turbo oil return line. Because a turbocharged engine has a higher operating temperature they used sodium filled exhaust valves and a thermostat controlled oil cooler (air/oil model).

In 1983 the B23 was introduced to the United States market as a B23F engine. Also introduced in 1983, the "intercooler boost system" (IBS) was introduced for the B21FT motors. The IBS kit consisted of an intercooler, appropriate ducting, a new fan shroud, new oil cooler lines and mounting brackets, and optionally an automatic transmission kit. Canada also received the B21FT, along with a detuned B23E in 1983.

Midway through the 1984 model year, the "intercooler boost system" became standard on North American 240 Turbos. Additionally a bigger clutch and a stepped flywheel were included.

In 1985 a revised, "low friction" design was introduced, dubbed the B200 and B230 (depending on displacement). Also introduced in 1989 were 16 valve, twin-cam variants of the B200 and B230, dubbed the B204 and B234 respectively. The B204 was also available in turbo form in some markets (such as Italy) where large displacement motors were taxed heavily. The B204FT has a catalytic converter and generates . Both were the first redblocks standard equipped with oil squirters for piston cooling. Crankshaft, connecting rods and pistons were all forged. Exhaust valves were sodium filled for cooler operation. It has smaller valves and stiffer valve springs than n/a 16V. Other differences from the normal 16V redblock engine are that it uses a remote mounted oil filter (Away from block on exhaust side engine mount) and a windage tray.

For the B230 engines 1993, piston cooling, oil squirting jets were added to help alleviate piston slap problems on the turbo motors. Another modification was to go from a square toothed timing belt set up to a round toothed timing belt setup which made for quieter belt running.

Although availability of the redblock was phased out in 1995 in North America, production continued in Europe until 1998 when the 940 model was discontinued.

Nomenclature
The B21, and related red block motors, were named using the following convention: B##X or B##VX. Where B stands for "bensin" (gasoline), ## stands for the displacement in decilitres, and X is an appropriate suffix. On the later low-friction motors, V denotes SOHC configuration (0) or DOHC configuration (4, for 4 valves per cylinder).

i.e. B230 (SOHC, 2.3 litres), B234 (2.3 litres, DOHC * 4 valves per cylinder * 4 cylinders = 16 valves)

The following suffixes were commonly used by Volvo:

 A - single constant-pressure type carburetor (such as the Pierburg 175 CDUS), typically with manual choke
 B - high compression, with twin carburetor's, either twin Zenith-Stromberg carburettors or twin SU's.
 E - high compression, no catalyst, mechanical fuel injection K-Jetronic
 BxxET - K-Jetronic turbo
 B2xxET - Motronic controlled electronic fuel injection, turbo.
 F - low compression (9.8:1 on B230F, 9.5:1 on B280F, 10.0:1 on B234F and 10.7:1 on B204F), US/Europe version (F for Federal) with catalytic converter. Europe/APAC version, fuel injected (usually LH Jetronic or Bendix Regina)
 K - single jet type carburetor (such as the Solex-Cisac carbs), typically with automatic choke
 G - LH2.4 Jetronic but without catalytic converter, CO adjustment on the AMM (similar to LH2.2 Jetronic). Some models without O2 sensor, others with O2 sensor which requires regular replacement at intervals due to lead fouling. For markets in which unleaded fuel was rare in the early 1990s, e.g. Eastern Europe.
 FB - low compression version of B230F and fitted with Volvo's own "tuning package" (9.3:1), consisting of the "531" cylinder head, VX3 camshaft, and better flowing exhaust headers. LH2.4 Jetronic fuel injection, for the European and Australian markets. Available as an option on 1991 and 1992 models.
 FX - same as the FB but with the distributor mounted on the block (instead of the head) for use in the 240.
 FD - essentially a B230F fitted with exhaust gas recirculation (EGR) and Pulse air system for cleaner emissions
 T - turbocharged, after E or F suffix (example: B21ET, B230FT)
 FK - low pressure turbo, 1995 onward, not supplied in North America. Identical to the B230FT engine of that time but lowered boost level at 
(boost level was lowered because of taxes although only in some countries)
 FT - LH-Jetronic 2.2/2.4, turbocharger, 8.7:1 Static compression ratio achieved by dished pistons.
(available through the Turbo+ package)

Special versions

B17
Special version for certain European export markets (e.g. Greece, Israel) with shorter stroke than the B19,  bore and stroke for  displacement.

B19 Turbo

The   B19ET was sold in certain markets where engines of over 2–litre displacement were heavily taxed, such as Italy. It is a very robust engine with forged pistons (made by Kolbenschmidt). The B19 later evolved into the B200 low friction engine.

B23 Turbo

The B23ET and B23FT motors were offered for two years only in the 1983 and 1984 Volvo 700 series. Both the B23ET and B23FT are somewhat unusual in the 700 series, as they were the only turbo motors offered in the 700 series with a block mounted distributor, forged pistons and a forged crankshaft. The B23ET was the only redblock known to be equipped with a small coolant passage version of the higher flowing 405 cylinder head, the FT had to make do with normal 398 head. As these motors predate the low-friction B200 and B230 turbos and are equipped with forged pistons and crank, they are often considered one of the most robust Volvo turbo motors.

16 Valve Variants

Introduced in 1988 for the 740 GLE (and later used in the 940/960), The 16-Valve Redblock motors were offered in both a 2.0–litre Turbo (B204FT/GT) and a 2.3–litre  Naturally aspirated version (B234F). The head was designed for Volvo by either Cosworth or Porsche. In addition to the 16 Valve head, these motors were equipped with twin counter rotating external balance shafts and the engine block itself differs from the 8V redblock. The block differed from the standard B230 in that the auxiliary shaft (used to drive the oil pump and distributor on models that had block mounted distributors) was replaced with an external oil pump. The 16-Valve head was itself a completely new design for Volvo: The head was of a multi-piece design featuring a separate cam carrier and lower section. The later "white block" motors can trace their head design back to the two-piece setup found in the B204 and B234. The 2.0 litre turbo variant was introduced for European markets with tax structures tied to engine displacement such as Italy. Unique to the B204 turbo was an exhaust gas pyrometer which was used to detect excessively high exhaust temperatures. When excessively high exhaust temperatures were detected, the fuel injection computer would enrich the mixture. It has a forged crankshaft, cast pistons, and  connecting rods.

Although a powerful engine for its time, the 16 Valve engine can experience some problems that can be solved easily. One of the few problems is oil pump gear problems leading to broken timing belts. The oil pump gear itself can fail around the mounting flange, or, more often, the weak 8.8 (grade 5) grade bolt holding the gear can break. It is strongly recommended to use a 10.9 (grade 8) grade bolt when replacing the oil pump gear. Another cause for timing belt failure is improperly adjusting the timing belt on engines with a manual tensioner (1989 to very early 1990 models only) or improperly adjusting the balance shaft belt. Because this is an interference engine, damage will occur if the timing belt fails. Another common occurrence is that the balance shaft's oil seals are prone to leak on older engines. New replacement sealings tend to start leaking again due to 'worn in irregularities' on the shaft itself. Many people have removed the balance shaft belt or the balance shaft assemblies altogether to prevent belt failure and/or leakage. The balance shafts are only there to lessen high rpm second order vibrations, and removing them will only affect high rpm vibrations. Once all the common problems are solved, the 16 Valve engines are just as reliable as their SOHC counterparts.

The recommended timing belt interval for these engines is every , or earlier if the engine is modified. It is also recommended to replace the crank and camshaft seals at every interval and to thoroughly inspect the tensioner and idler pulleys for wear.

Volvo Penta

Volvo Penta sold the OHC redblocks as marine engines as well, just like the older OHV engines. The engines with  displacement, identified as the Volvo Penta AQ151 (8 valve) and AQ171 (dohc 16 valve) models, got a forged crankshaft with a longer stroke of  together with pistons with a  lower compression height. The  blocks still had B230 cast in the block. Penta used both the 8 valve and 16 valve cylinder heads. Both the 8V and 16V variants used the same engine block series, the 16V versions didn't use the different block like the automotive B2x4 with balance shafts.

See also
 List of Volvo engines

References

External links
 Volvo Cars of N.A. Online Bookstore
 16 Valve Information

B21
Slanted engines
Straight-four engines
Gasoline engines by model